The third season of Rick and Morty, an American animated television series created by Dan Harmon and Justin Roiland, originally aired on Cartoon Network's late night programming block, Adult Swim. It premiered with "The Rickshank Rickdemption", which aired unannounced on April 1, 2017, as part of Adult Swim's annual April Fools' prank. As a result of production delays, the remaining episodes began airing weekly nearly four months later, on July 30, 2017. The season comprised ten episodes but it originally was supposed to fourteen episodes, and its initial airing concluded on October 1, 2017.

The premiere picks up where the second-season finale left off, as the show continues to follow the adventures of the members of the Smith household. When Jerry asks Beth to choose between him and Rick, the strength of their marriage is tested. Jerry is confronted with the loss of his family, while Beth begins to discover her independence again. Morty and Summer deal with their parents' separation by seeking more control over their lives. Rick's nihilistic way of life continues to prevent him from bonding with his family, as he remains unable to change his self-destructive behavior.

The third season of Rick and Morty delivered the highest ratings in Adult Swim's history and was the top-rated comedy among millennials on television. The season received largely positive reviews, with many critics highlighting its focus on character development. The season has also received a number of awards and nominations, including the win of a Critics' Choice Award for Best Animated Series, and the show's first Emmy Award which it won for the third-season's standout episode "Pickle Rick", in the category for Outstanding Animated Program.

Cast and characters

The actors and actresses listed below lend their voices to the corresponding animated characters.

Main cast
 Justin Roiland as Rick Sanchez and Morty Smith, the two main characters of the show; Rick is an eccentric mad scientist and Morty is his kind but easily distressed grandson
 Chris Parnell as Jerry Smith, Rick's son-in-law and Morty's father; a simple-minded and insecure person, who disapproves of Rick's influence over his family.
 Spencer Grammer as Summer Smith, Rick's granddaughter and Morty's sister; a conventional teenager who worries about improving her status among her peers.
 Sarah Chalke as Beth Smith, Rick's daughter and Morty's mother; a generally level-headed person, who is dissatisfied with her marriage.

Guest cast

Other cast members
Other cast members of the season, who each have voiced one or more characters, include: Dan Harmon, Brandon Johnson, Tom Kenny, Maurice LaMarche, Nolan North, Cassie Steele, Kari Wahlgren, Laura Bailey, John DiMaggio, Ryan Ridley, Scott Chernoff, Dan Benson, Clancy Brown, Echo Kellum, Melique Berger, William Holmes, Tara Strong, Jeff B. Davis, Jonas Briedis, Phil Hendrie, Rob Paulsen, Alex Jayne Go, Jennifer Hale and Mariana Wise.

Episodes

Production

Renewal and staff additions

Adult Swim renewed Rick and Morty for a third season on August 12, 2015, shortly after a successful second-season premiere. Talking about the renewal, the two co-creators and executive producers expressed their delight at the series' popularity. Dan Harmon stated that it is "an honor to see Rick and Morty join the exclusive club of shows with over nineteen episodes", and Justin Roiland added "I am blown away by the seemingly instant success of Rick and Morty. I look forward to continuing their adventures!"

In an October 2015 interview with The Hollywood Reporter, Roiland revealed that the team had received a lot of scripts from female writers for the upcoming season, which had never happened before. He stated that "We've gone from having zero spec scripts [in the running from female] candidates, to having five or six of them, so it's looking very likely that season three will have one, potentially two gals in the room." Eventually, four female writers were added to the staff, and—counting out the co-creators of the show, Justin Roiland and Dan Harmon—the writing room for the third season was gender-balanced.

The writing staff consisted of eleven writers, who collectively wrote and repeatedly rewrote each episode. Harmon noted that the writers' ideas were blended and refined during the writing process, and that the name of the writer that appeared in the opening credits of an episode is usually that of the person who had been assigned to prepare the episode's outline. Sarah Carbiener, one of the new female writers, said that she managed to learn many things from her experience as a member of the writing team. She explained that a story that for other shows would have been an entire episode, for Rick and Morty it will be only its first few minutes. Therefore, the team had to write a large amount of story in a very short time.

Schedule delays and conclusion

Writing began on November 2, 2015, and the first episode was recorded on February 18, 2016. In July 2016, already behind on schedule, the production team admitted that the success of the series had increased pressure to meet the expectations of the viewers. The creative freedom provided by Adult Swim entailed taking responsibility for product quality, and as the bar had risen higher, work had become harder, improvements were constantly being sought, and this often resulted in delays. Harmon told the assembled press at the 2016 San Diego Comic-Con that "it’s not an endless perfectionism because you know when something finally clicks and you go 'this is a good episode of TV.'" He added that the animators had to suffer the worst part of the schedule delays, as they were forced to work weekends in order to cope with the demanding workload.

In September 2016, the writing team had finished writing new episodes and they were waiting on their return from Bardel Entertainment, Rick and Mortys Canadian animation studio, for in-house screenings. After the animatics (video recorded versions of a hand-drawn storyboard with very limited motion) for each episode were made, and the production team was able to pre-visualize the animation, additional passes on the scripts would follow. In an interview with The Detroit Cast, writer Ryan Ridley revealed that the writing process for the third season was completed in November 2016, and noted that a season of Rick and Morty takes a long time to write and animate.

In February 2017, Harmon announced on his podcast, Harmontown, that the season was in the animation process, after a long period of writing. Around the same time, Bardel Entertainment's production supervisor  Mark Van Ee confirmed that "everything is on track." In June 2017, when production of the season had been completed, Harmon wrote a series of posts on Twitter, where he refuted reports about his disagreements with Roiland being the main cause of the delay, and explained that the writing process took longer than expected to complete because of his perfectionism. As a result, the third season of Rick and Morty consisted of only ten episodes instead of fourteen, as was initially intended.

Release

The third season of Rick and Morty originally aired Sundays at 11:30 p.m EST. on Adult Swim, the adult-oriented nighttime programming block of Cartoon Network. The network offered free livestreams for the first two episodes of the season, with the remaining episodes requiring a cable subscription to watch the show live as it aired. Following the conclusion of the show's third season, Adult Swim made a livestream marathon of Rick and Morty available to watch on its official website in select regions, hoping to dissuade viewers from watching other illegal livestreams.

The episodes were made available to watch on Netflix in a number of countries outside the United States, one week after their original airdate. The season was added to Hulu on June 23, 2018, with the expansion following a similar timeline with that of the two previous seasons for the streaming service. Uncensored versions of the season are also available to purchase on various digital distribution platforms, including iTunes, Amazon and Microsoft Store. The digital release includes commentaries on every episode, and seven more short videos featuring co-creators Dan Harmon and Justin Roiland.

The season was released on DVD and Blu-ray on May 15, 2018, with special features including exclusive commentary and animatics for every episode, the origins of Rick and Morty, "inside the episode" material and an exclusive "inside the recording booth" session. Game of Thrones star Peter Dinklage and showrunners David Benioff and D. B. Weiss recorded audio commentary for the episode "Pickle Rick". Other guest commentaries include Marilyn Manson, Courtney Love, Russell Brand, and the winner of a crowdfunding campaign launched by Justin Roiland and Dan Harmon to support Planned Parenthood. In his Blu-ray review for Forbes, Luke Y. Thompson describes the release as "a thorough set that seems to have covered all the angles, and will provide hours of fun to even those fans who've watched every episode multiple times already."

Reception

Critical response

The season has an approval rating of 96% from Rotten Tomatoes based on 10 reviews, and an average rating of 8.95 out of 10, with the site's consensus: "Rick and Morty dives into new and even kookier cosmic dilemmas in a third season that interrogates familial bonds, love, and nihilismtreating all existential topics to the series' trademark serrated wit."

Jesse Schedeen of IGN described the third season of the show as darker and more unpredictable than the first two, and praised its high-concept storytelling and character development. Schedeen gave the season an 8.8 out of 10 rating, saying that it "didn't quite reach the heights of Season 2, but it is the series' most consistently entertaining and ambitious season yet". Holding a similar position, Corey Plante of Inverse said that Rick and Morty managed to be both dark and funny in its third season.

Zack Handlen of The A.V. Club agreed that this was the darkest season of Rick and Morty, though he noted that the viewers have become desensitized to the show's violence. "In previous seasons, the show managed a balance between self-mockery and honest joy in absurd scenarios. That joy is still there, more or less, but there’s a bitterness to it that’s harder and harder to ignore." Mike Cosimano of Comics Gaming Magazine did not think that the third season was dark; he said that it used "cheap gut punches to elicit that very reaction". He added that too many of the season's episodes were weak, since the show focuses on character development only in its first half, resulting in an uneven season. He considered the season to be a disappointment, rating it 6.5 out of 10.

Kayla Cobb of Decider focused on the dynamism displayed by Beth and Summer, as the characters broke the stereotypical conventions of the first two seasons. Cobb stated that "Season 3 is the first time Rick and Morty really  to its leading ladies, and it was a horrifying delight." Julia Alexander of Polygon  highlighted the philosophical conflict between nihilist realism and life in ignorant bliss as the season's main theme, and noted that "after an introspective season built on the importance of self-realization and reflection, Rick and Morty third year ended on a total reset," with Beth and the kids reuniting with Jerry in the season-finale, as they seek comfort through escapism and ignore the realities of their lives. Zack Handlen considered Jerry's return to be an anticlimax and "a necessary corrective to an arc that was in danger of going off the rails completely". Handlen appeared skeptical about Beth's statement in the final episode, that from this point things will be like season one again, saying that "the problem with going as far as season three went is that bridges stay burned."

Ratings

Rick and Morty completed its third season with overall viewership numbers increased by 81% over the previous season, and delivered the highest ratings in Adult Swim's history. Rick and Morty was the most popular television comedy within the 18–24 and 18–34 age ranges in the United States, based on "Live+7" ratings data spanning from December 2016 to September 2017. This rating system tracks live viewership plus streaming and on-demand viewing over an initial week-long period, and provides a more accurate picture of delayed viewing as compared to "Live+Same Day" ratings. Considering that episodes of the third season originally aired at 11:30 p.m. on Sundays, it is very likely that people would have watched them on-demand the next day or several days later.

Christina Miller, the president of Adult Swim, told Fortune that Rick and Morty "goes beyond just appealing to millennials," as numbers suggest that people of all ages are watching the show. The second episode of the season, which aired nearly four months after the unannounced premiere, was the season's most-watched episode with 2.86 million viewers, and the second-best on cable for the day it aired in adults 18–49, behind the weekly episode of Game of Thrones. The season finale was watched by 2.6 million live plus same day viewers and it was the most-watched telecast across all age groups.

Fanbase reactions
In an interview with The Hollywood Reporter, female writers Jane Becker, Sarah Carbiener and Jessica Gao addressed negative comments regarding their involvement in writing the third season of Rick and Morty, recalling a post on Reddit that called them "the social justice warriors that Dan had to hire". Gao stated:  Following the release of "Pickle Rick", one of the season's best-rated episodes, a number of fans participated in an online harassment campaign that targeted female writers of the show—especially Jane Becker and Jessica Gao—as they felt that they were "ruining the show" for them. Said writers received rape and death threats on Twitter, and had their personal information put online. In an interview with Entertainment Weekly, Dan Harmon confronted the trolls, saying: 

The Szechuan sauce reference in the season premiere brought huge online attention for McDonald's discontinued promotional product. Internet memes spread rapidly on Reddit and Twitter, more than 40,000 people signed a petition at Change.org, asking for the return of the sauce, while an eBay auction resulted in a 20-year-old packet of this teriyaki sauce being sold for $14,700. On October 7, 2017, McDonald's served limited quantities of the sauce, without explicitly naming Rick and Morty as a reason for the return. Many fans waited for hours in long queues, but not all of them were served as the fast-food outlets ran out of the product. The fiasco prompted enraged reactions by disappointed fans, with some of them acting out and mistreating the company's workers.

In the wake of these events, the Rick and Morty fanbase received a bad reputation, with James Grebey of Inverse noting:   Cameron Williams of Junkee attributed this "toxic behavior" to the rise of an aggressive type of entitled fan in the past decades, and examined the motivation of these people, noting:  Emily Gaudette of Newsweek said that, with the spike in popularity, the show has obtained an army of online devotees, and commented on groups like the self-described "Real Ricks", who identify themselves with the series' main character and believe that high intellect is an excuse for mistreating others. Gaudette noted that these groups do not represent the Rick and Morty fanbase, but they "tend to suck all the oxygen out of the virtual room." Series co-creator Justin Roiland said on his Twitter account that he sees more good than bad in the series' fanbase, and chooses to focus on that.

Accolades

Rick and Morty received a total of eight nominations for its third season in 2017 and 2018, of which it won an IGN Award and a Critics' Choice Television Award, both in the categories for "Best Animated Series". Furthermore, the episode "Pickle Rick" received three nominations, of which it won an Emmy Award for "Outstanding Animated Program" and an Annie Award for "Best General Audience Animated Television/Broadcast Production". With two nominations, "The Ricklantis Mixup" was another awarded episode of the season, that won its writers Ryan Ridley and Dan Guterman an Annie Award for "Outstanding Achievement for Writing in an Animated Television/Broadcast Production". Justin Roiland won an IGN Award for "Best Comedic TV Performance", while Christian Slater was nominated for a BTVA Voice Acting Award for his performance in "Vindicators 3: The Return of Worldender".

Notes

References

External links 

Rick and Morty
Rick and Morty seasons